MPP Yei Myint (also spelled Ye Myint; born 1953) is a Burmese artist. He was born in 1953 in Myingyan and studied at the State School of Fine Arts in Mandalay. Yei Myint is a student of Win Pe, who taught at this school. He was one of two Burmese artists who participated in the 1999 Philip Morris ASEAN Art Awards. He is one of the most recognized artists in Myanmar. He stands out as an important contemporary artist in Myanmar for his innovative use of visual vocabulary.

Yei Myint creates drawings, paintings and collages with a variety of styles. His innovative paintings use bold brush strokes. He is known for a series where he juxtaposed Vincent van Gogh, whom he admires, with images of Bagan, the ancient capital of Burma.  He has exhibited in Burma, Japan (1995, 1999), Singapore (1996, 1998, 2005), Taiwan (1996), Malaysia (1997, 1999), Germany (1999) and Finland (2001).  His work is exhibited by the Singapore Art Museum, the National Art Gallery of Malaysia and the Fukuoka Asian Art Museum, Japan.

Museum Collections
 Fukuoka Asian Art Museum
 Singapore Art Museum
 National Art Gallery (Malaysia)

Notes

Further reading
 

Living people
1953 births
Burmese painters
People from Mandalay Region